Hina Shah is an Indian entrepreneur who awards, including the Stree Shakti Award which was awarded by Pratibha Patil the President of India for her contribution in the field of economic development, the Bharat Jyoti Award, the Titan Be More Legend title, and the Best Project Award from the Project Management Institute.

Women's empowerment 
She began her career in 1976 in the plastic packaging industry.

In 1986, she started The International Centre for Entrepreneurship and Career Development]. Shah's "Entrepreneurship Development Programme for Women", was started with 25 women from Gujarat and 16 of them established non-traditional businesses which were still in business in 2011.

Shah was instrumental in initiating and institutionalizing women's economic empowerment strategies in Zambia, Bangladesh, Lesotho, Botswana, Cameroon, Malaysia, Philippines, Jordan, Sri Lanka, Guyana, Ivory Coast, and St. Kitts.

References 

 Interview of Hina Shah, founder, ICECD

External links 

 Icecd.org
Satyameva Jayate International School

Year of birth missing (living people)
Living people
Businesspeople from Gujarat
Indian women chief executives
Indian chief executives
Businesswomen from Gujarat